Paolo Bergamo (born 21 April 1943) is an Italian former football referee. He is better known as the former Italian Football Federation (FIGC) referee designator who was implicated in the 2006 Italian football scandal, and who resigned his position on 4 July 2006.

Bergamo officiated at UEFA Euro 1984, supervising the semifinal between France and Portugal. His additional competitions include qualifiers for the 1982 World Cup, 1986 World Cup, and Euro 1984. He is known to have served as a FIFA referee during the period from 1981 to 1985.

References

1943 births
Italian football referees
People involved in the 2006 Italian football scandal
Living people
UEFA Euro 1984 referees